Pastwiska  is a very small settlement in the administrative district of Gmina Nowe, within Świecie County, Kuyavian-Pomeranian Voivodeship, in north-central Poland.

The village has a population of 130 as of the most recent census.

References

Pastwiska